Azatavan is a town in the Armavir Province of Armenia.

See also 
Armavir Province

References 

Populated places in Armavir Province